The Affair of Susan is a 1935 American comedy film directed by Kurt Neumann and starring Zasu Pitts, Hugh O'Connell and Walter Catlett. It is a remake of the 1928 silent film Lonesome. Two lonely people meet at an amusement park on Coney Island.

Partial cast
 Zasu Pitts as Susan Todd  
 Hugh O'Connell as Dudley Stone  
 Walter Catlett as Gilbert  
 Tom Dugan as Jeff Barnes  
 Inez Courtney as Mrs. Barnes  
 James Burke as Hogan  
 Nan Grey as Miss Skelly  
 Irene Franklin as Miss Perkins  
 William Pawley as Policeman

References

Bibliography
 Lowe, Denise. An Encyclopedic Dictionary of Women in Early American Films: 1895-1930. Routledge, 2014.

External links
 

1935 films
1935 comedy films
American comedy films
Films directed by Kurt Neumann
Films scored by Franz Waxman
Universal Pictures films
Remakes of American films
American black-and-white films
1930s English-language films
1930s American films